These are the official results of the men's 50 kilometres walk event at the 1983 World Championships held on 12 August 1983 in Helsinki, Finland.

Medalists

Abbreviations
All times shown are in hours:minutes:seconds

Records

Intermediates

Final ranking

See also
 1978 Men's European Championships 50km Walk (Prague)
 1980 Men's Olympic 50km Walk (Moscow)
 1982 Men's European Championships 50km Walk (Athens)
 1984 Men's Olympic 50km Walk (Los Angeles)
 1986 Men's European Championships 50km Walk (Stuttgart)
 1988 Men's Olympic 50km Walk (Seoul)

References

Notes

External links
 Results

W
Racewalking at the World Athletics Championships